Sahyadrimetrus kanarensis is a scorpion species found in Karnataka, India. It is mostly found in the Western Ghats, which is a biodiversity hotspot and a World Heritage Site. It is an endangered species with habitat destruction as the reason for its dwindling numbers.

References

External links
 Sahyadrimetrus kanarensis at NCBI

Fauna of Karnataka
Animals described in 1900
Scorpionidae